Ernest Arrighi de Casanova, 2nd Duke of Padoue (26 September 1814, Paris – 28 March 1888) was a French Bonapartist politician. Son of the 1st Duke of Padoue.

He was a Senator from 1853 to 1870, and was Minister of the Interior in 1859.
During the French Third Republic he was a member of the Chamber of Deputies from 1876 to 1881. He sat with the Appel au peuple parliamentary group.

References

1814 births
1888 deaths
Politicians from Paris
 2
French people of Corsican descent
Appel au peuple
French interior ministers
French Senators of the Second Empire
Members of the 1st Chamber of Deputies of the French Third Republic
Members of the 2nd Chamber of Deputies of the French Third Republic
Burials at Père Lachaise Cemetery